Kalinino is a rural locality (a village) in Pekshinskoye Rural Settlement, Petushinsky District, Vladimir Oblast, Russia. The population was 6 as of 2010.

Geography 
Kalinino is located on the Peksha River, 31 km northeast of Petushki (the district's administrative centre) by road. Tuykovo is the nearest rural locality.

References 

Rural localities in Petushinsky District